Amira Elghawaby is a Canadian journalist, communications professional, and human rights activist. She was appointed as Canada's first Special Representative on Combatting Islamophobia in January 2023.

Early life and education 
Elghawaby was born to Egyptian parents; her father was an engineer.

She emigrated to Canada at the age of two months with her mother, and also spent four of her early years in Bandung, Indonesia. She grew up in the East End of Ottawa.

Elghawaby has a degree in journalism and law from Carleton University.

Career 
Elghawaby is a human rights activist and a journalist. She is employed as a communications lead by the Canadian Race Relations Foundation, and is a freelance journalist who contributes columns to the The Toronto Star. She previously worked at CBC News, the Canadian labour movement, and as a human rights co-ordinator for the National Council of Canadian Muslims. She was one of the founding board members of the Canadian Anti-Hate Network and is a member of Canada's National Security Transparency Advisory Group.

On January 26, 2023, Prime Minister Justin Trudeau appointed Elghawaby as Canada's first special representative on combatting Islamophobia, for a four-year term. Her office has a budget of $5.6 million to cover the first five years of activities.

The National Council of Canadian Muslims described her appointment as a "historic moment for Muslims in Canada”. Days after her appointment Quebec Premier François Legault called for her resignation, after La Presse reported that Elghawaby had written that Quebeckers seem “influenced by anti-Muslim sentiment,” in a 2019 column in the Ottawa Citizen.  The same La Presse article also reported that in May 2021 Elghawaby wrote "I'm going to puke" on Twitter in reaction to an opinion editorial by Joseph Heath,  a philosophy teacher of the University of Toronto, who argued that French Canadians were the largest group in Canada to have suffered from British colonialism.

Trudeau said he expected her comments to be clarified, but later reaffirmed that he stands by her appointment. On February 1, 2023, Amira Elghawaby apologized for her comments about how her words in the past have hurt the people of Quebec. She expressed that has been listening to Quebecers.

A parliamentary motion in the National Assembly of Quebec denouncing her appointment was supported by the Coalition Avenir Québec, Quebec Liberal Party and the Parti Québécois.

On February 3, 2023, a letter in support of her appointment was published by a group of 30 prominent Québécois, including human rights lawyer Julius Grey, Quebec City Mosque co-founder Boufeldja Benabdallah, and Charles Taylor, professor emeritus at McGill University. The letter acknowledged the prior concern, but advocated for Elghawaby to be allowed to perform her new role. On February 5, a second letter with 200 signatories including Université de Montréal professor Nadia El-Mabrouk, and activist Ensaf Haidar, called for Elghawaby's resignation and the abolition of her office, signatories refused " to be associated to a Muslim community represented by people who promote a fundamentalist vision of Islam". On February 14, speaking at the Senate of Canada former Calgary mayor Naheed Nenshi raised concerns about Islamophobia and urged parliamentarians to stand up for Elghawaby. Rania Lawendy CEO of Action for Humanity Canada, said that the letters show "the Canadian political landscape is not a safe place for a visible Muslim woman, and this incident is a perfect example of how discrimination continues to be tolerated by our government leaders."

Personal life 
Elghawaby lives in Ottawa. She is married with three children. She is Muslim.

See also 

 Islamophobia in Canada

References

External links 
 
 

Living people
Year of birth missing (living people)
Carleton University alumni
Canadian human rights activists
21st-century Canadian journalists
Canadian women journalists
Egyptian emigrants to Canada
Journalists from Ontario
Muslim writers
21st-century Muslims